Chaetium is a genus of Neotropical plants in the grass family.

 Species
 Chaetium bromoides (J.Presl) Benth. - Mexico, Central America
 Chaetium cubanum (C.Wright) Hitchc. - Cuba
 Chaetium festucoides Nees - Colombia (Bolívar), Venezuela (Guárico, Monagas), Brazil (Rio Grande do Norte, Ceará, Paraíba, Piauí, Maranhão, Pernambuco)

See also
 List of Poaceae genera

References

Panicoideae
Poaceae genera
Grasses of North America
Grasses of South America
Taxa named by Christian Gottfried Daniel Nees von Esenbeck